Lars-Åke "Lasse" Wiklöf (21 September 1944 – 23 August 2008) was a politician in the Åland Islands, an autonomous and unilingually Swedish territory of Finland.

Minister for finance (2005–2007)
Member of the lagting (Åland parliament) (1995–2004)
Minister for finance (1991–1995)
Member of the lagting (1988–1991)
Minister for finance (1984–1988)
Member of the lagting (1975–1979, 1 November – 31 December 1983)

References

Politicians from Åland
1944 births
2008 deaths